Giorgi Zauris dze Gakharia (born 19 March 1975) is a Georgian politician who served as the 14th Prime Minister of Georgia from 8 September 2019 until his resignation on 18 February 2021.

Education 
In 1992–1994 Gakharia studied at Ivane Javakhishvili Tbilisi State University, faculty of History. In 1994–1999 he studied at Lomonosov Moscow State University. He is a Master of Political Science. In 2002–2004 he studied at Lomonosov Moscow State University's Higher Business School (Master of Business Management). In 2006–2009 he was an invited lecturer in Applied Biotechnology at Moscow State University.

Business activity 
From May, 2004 to November, 2008 Gakharia took the position of the Director-General of SFK Group; from November, 2008 to February, 2013 he took the position of the Director of Germany GR & Business Development at the Lufthansa Service Holding AG. (LSG, Frankfurt am Main) in Eastern Europe, CIS countries and Russian Federation.

Early political life 

After winning the 2012 parliamentary elections, a new ruling party came to Georgia, which formed a new government led by Bidzina Ivanishvili in October 2012. Giorgi Gakharia joined the ruling party in 2013 where he was accepted from the very beginning. Because of his past and knowledge, he became the country ombudsman in March 2013, After that, his political life began with the Georgian Dream.

As a result of his success in 2014, he was appointed Secretary of the Economic Council, where he made a name for himself and became an important person in the Georgian Dream.

Political progress 

As a result of Gakharia's advancement in politics, he became quite famous, in 2016, the Georgian Dream won a second term and remained in power. After winning the election, a new government was formed where Prime Minister Kvirikashvili named Gakharia Minister of Economy. On November 27, 2016, the new government won the support of the majority and the new cabinet was approved.

Gakharia became the Minister of Economy of the country and at the same time he became the new government. He became even more famous. His influence was growing quite fast. In 2017, Kvirikashvili appointed him Minister of Internal Affairs, from where his main political life began.

Work under new government conditions 
During the prime minister of Giorgi Kvirikashvili, Gakharia became a very important person in the country, his influence was especially increased by being the Minister of Internal Affairs, where he achieved a lot of success.

On June 13, 2018, Prime Minister Kvirikashvili resigned. The ruling party has named former Finance Minister Mamuka Bakhtadze as the country's Prime Minister. Parliament declared confidence in Bakhtadze's cabinet on June 20, Where Gakharia was still the Minister of Internal Affairs.

Gakharia became even more influential in the government during Bakhtadze's term as Prime Minister. On July 17, Bakhtadze appointed him First Vice Prime Minister.

Gakharia was the most influential person in Bakhtadze's cabinet, Prime Minister Bakhtadze considered him his right hand man

From May 1, 2019, he becomes the Secretary of the Security Council.

Gakharia, as the Minister of Internal Affairs, was an important figure not only for the government but also for the Georgian Dream. He was particularly critical of the Georgian opposition and the National Movement in particular. Gakharia played an important role in the country's domestic politics.

Gakharia's authority has been significantly shaken since the events of June 20, 2019, although Gakharia still held the position of the most important person in the government

Ministry of Internal Affairs 
In November, 2017 the Government of Georgia was reshuffled, including the leadership of the Ministry of Internal Affairs; consequently, on November 13, 2017 Giorgi Gakharia was appointed to the post of the Minister of Internal Affairs, replacing Giorgi Mgebrishvili.

Infantry Patrol 
Several months after the appointment, for ensuring the security for tourists and tourist areas the Infantry Patrol Subunit was created within the Patrol Police Department of the Ministry. Infantry patrol officers have received 3-week special retraining courses at the Academy of the Ministry of Internal Affairs; all of them know one or more foreign languages. They are provided with modern police equipment, including the latest generation of shoulder cameras.

Human Rights Protection Department 
The Human Rights Protection Department was created on January 1, 2018, in one month from the appointment of Giorgi Gakharia to the position of the Minister of Internal Affairs. The competences of the Department cover the timely response and effective investigation into the cases such as domestic offenses, violence against women, crimes committed on the ground of discrimination, trafficking, crime by/against juveniles.

2019 Georgian protests 

On June 20, 2019, Russian politician Sergei Gavrilov was invited to Georgia for a one-day speech in the country's parliament. The session was held in Russian, which provoked protests from a large part of the Georgian population, especially young Georgians. Throughout the day, the population protested against this action of the Russian politician and the support of the ruling team on this issue.

The population organized a huge rally in front of the parliament on the evening of June 20, people demanded the resignation of the speaker of the parliament Irakli Kobakhidze and the punishment of the Georgian Dream government, this protest soon turned into a storm in the parliament.
Minister of Internal Affairs Gakharia issued an order to disperse the protesters, firearms were used. Two people lost their sight as a result of a bullet that took hundreds of people across the country to a clinic that day

People's demand for Gakharia to resign

After June 20, 2019, people started a daily protest in front of the country's parliament, members of the rally demanded the resignation of the Minister of Internal Affairs Giorgi Gakharia due to the events of June 20,
Despite the demand of the population, Gakharia refused to resign, and the anger of the people increased. Despite the demand of the population, the Minister of Internal Affairs did not resign.

Candidate for the Prime minister
On September 2, 2019, Prime Minister Mamuka Bakhtadze resigned, the country was waiting for the appointment of a new Prime Minister.
On the same day, the opinion was expressed that the Minister of Internal Affairs and Vice Prime Minister Giorgi Gakharia was considered as a candidate for the post of Prime Minister.
Indeed, on September 3, Bidzina Ivanishvili, chairman of the Georgian Dream party, nominated him as a candidate for prime minister.

Gakharia presented the future plans and the Cabinet of Ministers, a large part of the population did not like this decision as well as the Georgian opposition.

Prime Minister-designate Gakharia arrives in parliament on September 6 to discuss future plans and goals, heated debate between opposition and Gakharia,
The same day, the opposition said they did not support Gakharia and his team.

Gakharia arrived in parliament on September 8 to answer questions and gain support. The Georgian Dream party supported him and approved him by 98 votes on September 8.

Prime minister

In October 2019, as a result of a meeting between Ilham Aliyev and Giorgi Gakharia, Azerbaijan opened the entrance to the Davit-Gareji Monastery for Georgia.

On December 12, 2019, Gakharia was in Ukraine where he met with President and Government of Ukraine. At the same Day, a summit of GUAM Organization for Democracy and Economic Development was held in Yalta, In which Gakharia also took part.

He was Prime Minister of Georgia during the Covid-19 pandemic, Gakharia and his Cabinet coped well with the first wave of the virus. A coordination council was set up, headed by Gakharia. During the pandemic businesses were experiencing difficulties. The government announced a large-scale lockdown which further complicated the situation of the people. On April 24, 2020, Gakharia announced a plan to provide financial assistance to the people, which included a total of 3.5 billion GEL. By this plan government has financed various state taxes. The country provided financial assistance to the people but it did not turn out to be enough. The government has closed all tourism zones and reduced the number of tourists. The second wave of virus hit the country even harder. The government has not announced any restrictions, which has further increased the cases of the virus. Due to the difficult epidemiological situation a curfew was declared in the country on November 9, on November 26, Gakharia announced the second mass lockdown in the country, which was effective until February 1, 2021.

On 2 November 2020, during COVID-19 pandemic in Georgia, Gakharia tested positive for the virus.

On January 21, 2021, Georgia won a dispute with Russia in the Strasbourg court. It was a great victory for the country and the people. On that day, Gakharia appointed Davit Zalkaliani Minister of Foreign Affairs of Georgia, as Vice prime minister

On February 12, Prime minister Gakharia fired the governors of some regions of the country and appointed others.

2020 Georgian parliamentary election

Georgian Dream launched an election campaign in July 2020. Gakharia participated in the campaign from the very beginning as a member of the Georgian Dream party. In September, the party nominated him as a candidate for prime minister in the run-up to the elections, Gakharia was very popular for this period he helped the party considerably, And indeed, under Gakharia's leadership, the Georgian Dream won the election. On December 24, the new parliament approved Giorgi Gakharia's cabinet for a second term. Gakharia was also a very important figure in his party, they called him a worthy leader and Prime Minister.

Resignation

Gakharia's resignation was very unexpected, a few days ago he said he was not going anywhere, but on the morning of February 18, very suddenly, he announced his resignation. As it became known in the future, Gakharia could not reach an agreement in the Georgian Dream, Gakharia also said that he no longer agreed with the positions of the Georgian Dream and he therefore left the party and the position. The situation in the country at the time: Nika Melia, chairman of the United National Movement party, was accused of organizing mass violence during the anti-government protests in 2019. When Melia declined to pay a $12,000 bail, a Georgian court ruled that Melia should be detained before his trial. In response, Melia said the court's ruling was "unlawful", and on 18 February, Gakharia resigned over the decision to detain Melia. Melia was arrested while at United National Movement party headquarters on 23 February. The ruling Georgian Dream party supported Irakli Garibashvili to replace Gakharia, and the Parliament voted 89–2 to appoint him on 22 February.

Separation from the Georgian Dream

On March 22, 2021, Gakharia announced that he remains in politics and is working to set a political agenda. On April 14, 2021, the Georgian Dream Party and the parliamentary majority were abandoned by MPs Giorgi Khojevanishvili, Beka Liluashvili, Ana Buchukuri, Alexander Motserelia, Shalva Kereselidze and Mikheil Daushvili. According to the deputies, they are forming a new party together with Giorgi Gakharia. [3]

3 MPs left the Georgian Dream and were elected by 3 party lists. Giorgi Khojevanishvili was the governor of Shida Kartli before being elected as a majoritarian MP in Gori-Kaspi. Alexander Motserelia, the former governor of Samegrelo-Zemo Svaneti, is currently the majoritarian MP of Abasha-Martvili-Tsalenjikha-Chkhorotsku, and Shalva Kereselidze, the former governor of Mtskheta-Mtianeti, is the majoritarian of Mtskheta-Dusheti-Tianeti-Kazbegi.

Ana Buchukuri, elected from the Georgian Dream party list, was in the government of Giorgi Gakharia, Deputy Chief of Staff of the Prime Minister, Beka Liluashvili - Adviser to the Prime Minister on Economic Affairs, and Mikheil Daushvili - Business Ombudsman. [4]

On May 28, Giorgi Gakharia was joined by Giorgi Abashishvili, Head of the Presidential Administration of Georgia, and Levan Dolidze, former Ambassador of Georgia to NATO.
The presentation of the party was held on May 29, 2021. The party is called For Georgia

On the same day, Gakharia was elected chairman of the party, He spoke about the problems within country: corruption nepotism and other, he expressed his and his party plans and goals. Gakharia noted that the country no longer has time to lose and it must develop.

Critical evaluations 
On May 31, Giorgi Gakharia held a press conference where he spoke about the problems of the country and his party plans. he also talked about his former teammates. After that, the members of the Georgian Dream began to clearly criticize Gakharia. Irakli Kobakhidze Chairman of the Georgian Dream, said that Gakharia was traitor and was trying to start a crisis in the country, together with the opposition, Similar statements were made by other members of the party.

There was criticism from the opposition as well. Some of them called Gakharia Georgian Dream 2, and Bidzina Ivanishvili's project. Bidzina Ivanishvili Former Chairman of the Georgian Dream  called Gakharia a traitor to the party and Nation, because he resigned when the Party needed him.

Giorgi Gakharia responded to the criticism of his former teammates as follows:
The events are developing in an interesting and faster way than expected... "No one and nothing can stop the truth. Eventually, everyone will understand this. Again without gossiping, we unite for #Georgia, against no one!' read in his letter. On June 8, Gakharia was in political show and he said that he was nobody's project and he was not going to gossip about anyone.

Criticism of Gakharia and his new party continued even more sharply, especially from government-run TV channels, such as TV Imedi, where Gakharia was particularly criticized and told a lot of bad things about him.

On June 23–24, Gakharia and his party attended meetings in the United States, particularly in Washington, DC, while members of the UNM party were in Washington at the same time. Georgian media reported that Gakharia and UNM leader, convicted ex-president Mikheil Saakashvili, were in the same hotel, where they met and discussed future plans. This was followed by protests from Georgian Dream supporters, who oppose Mikheil Saakashvili because of his political past. Certain news outlets criticized Gakharia and even called him a traitor and an enemy of the people for meeting with Saakashvili. Gakharia denied this and called the Georgian Dream-run media a pity.

After this information was spread, Giorgi Gakharia was asked to leave his political office in Batumi. Members of Gakharia's team called this action was directed by the ruling party.

Despite great delays, Gakharia continued to promote his party throughout Georgia, saying he and his party would run in the 2021 local elections and bring about change in the country.

Work on the opposition wing 

After Gakharia left the Georgian Dream team and left the post of the country's Prime Minister, he began to reform a new political party and start a new political life independently.

He created a team where there were a lot of experienced and young people, the beginning was difficult for their political party but Gakharia had the appropriate knowledge to develop his political party and earn the support of the people.

Gakhaia together with the members of his party started the movement all over Georgia, the presentation of the party for Georgia and the establishment of new party offices, many communications with the people soon made the party quite popular among the population.

Gakharia's team had representatives in the parliament, in many city councils. Many Former Georgian Dream Members Also Join Their Team The Georgian Dream team has slowly begun to crumble, with a breakaway party for Georgia growing.

Members of the party for Georgia could achieve a significant result in the October 2, 2021 self-government elections with a major challenge to reduce the support of the ruling team to 43%, which means the approval of the early parliamentary elections in 2022.

The holding of new parliamentary elections was the goal of them and the opposition as a whole, which was to be achieved as a result of the agreement of April 19, 2021. The fate of the 2022 elections should have been decided in the 2021 elections, however, the Georgian Dream government canceled the agreement in July, which would further deepen the confrontation between the opposition and the ruling team.

Giorgi Gakharia continued to recruit the party and prepare for the 2021 self-government elections in order to achieve a high result and to mark the start of the new parliamentary elections in 2022.

Candidate of Tbilisi Mayor

After Giorgi Gakharia, the resigned Prime Minister of Georgia who left the Georgian Dream and then founded a new party, a special confrontation started over him and his party members. That is why Gakharia presented himself as the Tbilisi mayoral candidate from the Party for Georgia at a presentation on September 1. 

He presented a plan on how to change the capital of Georgia, He also talked about his former teammates from the Georgian Dream and said that from that day they had to deal with Gakharia personally. He called the actions of the Georgian Dream shameful.

On that day, he also nominated Tbilisi majoritarians and members of the list and started the election campaign for victory in Tbilisi.

Electoral history

References

External links

 

1975 births
Living people
21st-century politicians from Georgia (country)
Georgian Dream politicians
Government ministers of Georgia (country)
Politicians from Tbilisi
Prime Ministers of Georgia